Superior High School is a high school located in Superior, Montana and is part of Superior K-12 Schools. As of the 2006–2007 school year, Superior remains a class B high school.  There is an elementary school and junior high school sharing the campus.

Notes

External links
Official website
Superior School District website

Public high schools in Montana
Schools in Mineral County, Montana